Przygórze  is a village in the administrative district of Gmina Nowa Ruda, within Kłodzko County, Lower Silesian Voivodeship, in south-western Poland. Prior to 1945 it was in Germany.

The village has a population of 860.

Patryk Lis famously known as a part of L9 resides in the area,

References

Villages in Kłodzko County